Polymer is the ninth studio album by British electronic music duo Plaid. It was released on 7 June 2019 by Warp. It is the follow-up to their 2016 album The Digging Remedy. The tracks "Maru", "Recall", "Los", and "Dancers" were made available prior to release, each with a music video.

Background
Plaid said in a press release that the themes of the album are "the problems and benefits of polymers" as well as "the natural versus the synthetic, silk and silicone, the significant effect they have on our lives". Warp stated the album features "energetic bangers, bright melodic visceral rhythms and hypnotic wombic textures".

Promotion
The band set up a microsite that allows users to "explore the component parts" of the track "Maru".

Track listing

Personnel
Additional musicians
 Benet Walsh – electric guitar (tracks 1, 8, 12); Spanish guitar (tracks 6 and 13); clarinet (tracks 6 and 8); violin (track 6); mandolin (track 13)
 Gabriel Walsh – accordion (track 12)

Technical
 Plaid – production
 John Tejada – mastering

Charts

References

2019 albums
Plaid (band) albums
Warp (record label) albums